Hendler Creamery is a historic industrial complex in Jonestown, Baltimore, Maryland. Since it spans an entire block it has addresses at 1100 E. Baltimore St. and 1107 E. Fayette St. "The Hendler Creamery is historically significant for its contribution to the broad patterns of history in three areas of significance: transportation, performing arts, and industry."

Varying usages

Construction and architect

The Hendler Creamery consists of two adjacent building complexes. The original  three-story brick Richardsonian Romanesque building was constructed as a cable car powerhouse in 1892, replacing five old houses on the site in the Old Town / Jonestown neighborhood east of the downtown neighborhood and the dividing Jones Falls stream in East Baltimore.   This use necessitated massive arched doors and a mezzanine floor.  The construction is of red face brick with red mortar joints and Potomac red Seneca stone trim, and contains much architectural detailing. The front on East Baltimore Street includes four large contiguous Romanesque Revival half-round arched openings with four pairs of rectangular window openings directly above these. In reviewing plans for the building, the influential "The Sun" newspaper descriptively wrote at the time of February 1892, that "it would be one of the most prominent structures in that part of the city" and continued, "Economy, durability and simplicity are the controlling motives of the design, and a practical power-house, with a proper regard for architectural proportions and effect, without unnecessary ornamentation, is expected to be the result."

Additions for later owners including Hendler's Creamery for dairy products and their locally famous brand of ice cream,  were built in 1915-20 and 1949.  It is also connected to a one-story brick building built in the 1960s. The second building complex is a  brick warehouse structure built from 1923 to 1927.

The architect was Jackson C. Gott (1829-1909), a Baltimore-based architect who is survived by eight buildings currently listed on the National Register of Historic Places maintained by the United States Department of the Interior and its National Park Service. In the same year that the Jonestown cable-car powerhouse was built, Gott also designed in the northern area of the expanding city, the currently named Charles Theatre building on North Charles Street by East Lanvale Street (few blocks south of North Avenue, previously named Boundary Avenue as the old northern city limits from 1818 to 1888), also for the B.C.P.R. It too served as a cable-car powerhouse, in this case for the BCPR's 2.2 mile Blue Line, which ran south to north, essentially along Charles Street, from South Street by East Pratt Street on the downtown harbor waterfront and financial district to 25th Street (then named Huntingdon Avenue) in the Peabody Heights (now renamed Charles Village) neighborhood,  being recently developed by the 1870s on the north edge of the city. The structure later served for several purposes including a dance hall as the Famous Ballroom through the 20th century until presently renovated into a prominent multi-screen movie theater in the recently renamed Mid-Town Station North neighborhood. In the 1890s, Gott further designed two other well-known extant Baltimore buildings: the additional landmark with a dark gray granite stone central pyramidal tower and the west/south wings facing on Greenmount Avenue and Eager & Forrest Streets for the northern/eastern extensions of the old Maryland Penitentiary, founded 1806, previously facing on East Madison Street, (now renamed the Metropolitan Transition Center in the 2010s) in 1894, and the Southern District Police Station for the Baltimore City Police Department at 28 East Ostend Street (between South Charles and Light Streets) in the old South Baltimore / Federal Hill neighborhood in 1896.

Cable-car powerhouse

As a cable-car powerhouse for the Baltimore City Passenger Railway Company from 1892 to 1898, the building played an important role in Baltimore's transportation history as cable-car mass transit was first developed to replace the horse-car lines operating for half a century since the late 1850s. According to the Maryland Historical Trust, the building powered the run of cable from Gay Street to North Avenue, using two Reynolds compound non-condensing Corliss steam engines, 24" + 38" x 60". These propelled a sheave which pulled a continuous loop of cable and moved the car at a speed of around 11 miles per hour. Just like a subway line today, this line was designated by a color, the Red Line, and ran from East North Avenue, south down North Gay Street, curving around to the east on East Baltimore Street, and then on further east to Bank Street and Patterson Park in East Baltimore's developing Highlandtown neighborhood. The total mileage distance was 10.7.

Electric-powered cars with overhead lines began replacing cable cars on the Red Line on August 30, 1898, as a more economical and faster means of mass transit. Cables were removed immediately, but the expense of extracting the underground pulleys, sheaves and other steel/iron fittings was too much, and in most instances they were just covered over as streets were gradually repaired and resurfaced with bricks, cobblestones / Belgian blocks or later concrete / asphalt. With the switchover, The Baltimore City Passenger Railway Company was absorbed into Baltimore's merged trolley monopoly in the late 1890s with the formation of the United Railways and Electric Company (later the Baltimore Transit Company after a bankruptcy and reorganization in 1935, adding transit diesel powered buses to the extensive streetcar system), and power was generated at the newly constructed pile of the massive huge red brick  Pratt Street Power Plant, situated on the waterfront at municipal Pier 4, facing the Northwest Branch of the Patapsco River and its "Basin" (later known as the Inner Harbor). UREC held onto the landmark industrial building with its electric generators connected to great furnaces and boilers for steam power with four parallel smokestacks and conveyor belt system for loading coal ore fuel from moored harbor barges connected to waterfront terminal facilities further south in the Baltimore Harbor of the Baltimore and Ohio Railroad and the Western Maryland Railway trains from the mines in the Appalachian Mountains to the West, for a few decades, using the rear half as a "trouble station" for trolleys and renting out the front to the U.S. Navy (Maryland) Naval Reserves for use as a drill-room.

In all, the two later competing Baltimore cable-car companies (themselves a product of mid and late 19th century mergers and consolidations), the Baltimore Traction Company (BTC) and Baltimore City Passenger Railway (BCPR), built six powerhouses scattered through the city, three each. This was a very significant capital expense for an industrial enterprise that only lasted from 1891 to 1899. Of the three and a half surviving powerhouses, the later Hendler Creamery building on East Baltimore Street between East and Lloyd Streets is the only one listed on the National Register of Historic Places. As mentioned above, another Gott designed powerhouse survives today as the Charles Theatre (BCPR) building, while the third totally extant powerhouse (BTC) lies three blocks south at 1110 East Pratt Street by Central Avenue (formerly Canal Street and before that the Hartford Run stream). The latter was most recently used as the Pratt Street Garage of the Baltimore City Department of Public Works - Solid Waste Division.  It is now boarded up and waiting some kind of adaptive re-use. It stretches a full block, between East Pratt and Granby Streets, and is surrounded by Albemarle Square, a 15 block rebuilt and revitalized area that replaced a 1950s era of the high-rise towers of the now dilapidated and crime ridden Flag House Courts public housing projects, with a new surrounding neighborhood of multi-priced townhouse residences renamed Albemarle Square, which resembled the previous 19th and early 20th centuries tightly packed blocks of brick rowhouses of the old original Old Town / Jonestown communities founded in the 1760s.

While not having the architectural flair of Stanford White's nine-story Beaux-Arts Cable Building on lower Broadway in New York City, the Hendler Creamery is one of the absolute gems of the American cable powerhouses that have survived. For the most part these structures evidenced utilitarian, warehouse style construction, which can be seen clearly in the still extant LaSalle Street Cable Car Powerhouse in Chicago, Illinois.

The only other architecturally significant Baltimore cable-car powerhouse, the former Baltimore Traction Company's Druid Hill Avenue powerhouse and car barn, south of Druid Hill Park in the northwest city, lost half of its structure in 2005 in a spectacular 5 - alarm blaze. It is a massive Victorian and Romanesque-style red brick-and-stone trim structure. The Epworth Powerhouse (BTC) on Mosher Street in West Baltimore had been torn down years before (see drawing below in gallery). It is a lesson in a site's metamorphoses: going from a church to a powerhouse to a dry cleaning plant, and finally, after demolition, to a high-rise apartment building standing today. The last powerhouse (BCPR) on South Eutaw Street, south of West Baltimore Street, succumbed long ago to the pressures of razing and urban redevelopment.

Yiddish theatre

After the replacement of the cable car by electric trolleys, the Hendler Creamery was then converted into a performance space by Baltimore-born James Lawrence Kernan (1838-1912).  He was a theater manager, entrepreneur, and philanthropist, who earlier in his life had fought for the Confederates, been captured and held as a prisoner till the war's end at the brutal Point Lookout Prisoner-of-War Camp at the confluence of the Chesapeake Bay and Potomac River.  Returning to civilian life, among other ventures, he started a combination hotel and German Rathskeller and founded a hospital, which survives today as the University of Maryland Rehabilitation & Orthopaedic Institute.

Under Kernan's ownership, a second floor, containing an auditorium and dressing rooms, was installed above the first-floor engine room. He named it the Convention Hall Theater. It operated primarily as a Yiddish theater from 1903 to 1912, serving the largely Jewish immigrant population. Some of the city's earliest motion pictures were also shown here by Kernan. Yiddish theater was first performed in Baltimore in the mid-1880s at Concordia Hall, an aristocratic club of Baltimore German Jews. It burnt down in 1891.

The building's conversion to a theater links it to Baltimore's early-20th century performing arts history, which includes melodrama, movies, opera, vaudeville, as well as the Yiddish theater.

Hendler Ice Cream Company

The building's most important and longest historical legacy came when it was purchased by the Hendler Ice Cream Company in 1912 for $40,000 and converted to the country's first fully automated ice cream factory.

Besides producing one of Baltimore's favorite brands of ice cream, it played a major role in the development of the nation's ice cream business. Many important pioneering industry innovations were developed over the next 50 years in this building, including new kinds of packaging; the blade sharpener, which produced smoother ice cream; and fast freezing, which allowed ice cream to be frozen with a liquid cream texture. The adjoining building at 1107 East Fayette Street, built in the 1920s as part of the Hendler Creamery complex, is also significant, notably in the creation of one of the nation's first ice cream delivery systems by refrigerated truck. As the Maryland Historical Society noted in a blog posting, The Velvet Kind: The Sweet Story of Hendlers Creamery, "The ice cream was virtually everywhere in Maryland, as it was distributed to over 400 stores at the company’s peak, which kept the production lines humming. The factory ran six days a week with vanilla ice cream being made almost everyday. Vanilla, chocolate, and strawberry were production mainstays, but the creamery dabbled in more exotic flavors as well. Hutzler's department store sold several varieties, including ginger and peppermint. For the Southern Hotel,  Hendlers supplied a tomato sorbet which was served as a side dish rather than dessert. The eggnog ice cream was produced each year at Christmas time. Hendler made with real rum, was a major hit. The factory also cranked out other holiday-themed products, such as an Independence Day treat made with vanilla, strawberry, and blueberry ice creams and a Mother’s Day cake topped with a silk screen of James McNeill Whistler’s portrait of his mother."

The creamery closed in the 1970s. The nearby Jewish Museum of Maryland has an extensive archive of Hendler Company and family memorabilia.

Historic preservation designation

The Hendler Creamery was listed on the National Register of Historic Places in 2007.

Reuse

Following a fourth incarnation as a warehouse and city social services agency, the Hendler Creamery buildings are, as of the spring of 2014, being planned for refurbishment. The Commercial Group, a Maryland-based real estate and construction company, bought the building in 2012 for $1.08 million, and is planning a $51 million adaptive re-use, featuring 276 units, along with up to 11,000 sq ft of retail. The project includes exclusive amenities such as multiple outdoor courtyards, a pool deck overlooking the Baltimore skyline, basketball courts, and a yoga studio. Kirby Fowler, president of Downtown Partnership of Baltimore Inc., said redevelopment of the Hendler building would be the next chapter in a decade-long revival for Jonestown. “When you think about what that area used to be like 12 years ago, we’ve gone lightyears toward improvement,” Fowler said. “Albermarle Square [about four blocks away] is this incredibly progressive mixed-income project that came as the result of some HUD money and federal support, and it’s really helped expand Little Italy and Fells Point further north. There’s already progress heading in that direction, and this just continues that.”

Baltimore City officials have said that they view this location—two blocks east of the iconic Shot Tower, seven blocks west of the bustling campus of The Johns Hopkins Hospital and nine blocks north of the contemporary mixed-use development project Harbor East—as critical to attractively tying together the Hopkins medical facilities and Downtown Baltimore.

Gallery

References

External links

, including photo from 2006, at Maryland Historical Trust

Ashkenazi Jewish culture in Baltimore
Buildings and structures in Baltimore
Cable car railways in the United States
Former cinemas in the United States
Industrial buildings and structures on the National Register of Historic Places in Baltimore
Industrial buildings completed in 1892
Jewish theatres
Jews and Judaism in Baltimore
Jonestown, Baltimore
Romanesque Revival architecture in Maryland
Yiddish culture in Maryland
Yiddish theatre in the United States
1892 establishments in Maryland